Scharhörn is an uninhabited island in the North Sea belonging to the city of Hamburg, Germany. The once most important daymark on the North Sea coast, the Scharhörnbake, was maintained here by the City of Hamburg from 1440 to 1979.

Geography 

It is a part of Zone 1 of the Hamburg Wadden Sea National Park. Aside from a nature reserve warden, the island has no permanent residents.

Together with the artificial island of Nigehörn the island lies on a large sandbank. Historically the whole area including the reef was called Scharhörn and the sandbank Scharhörnplate. After the human supported formation of the island in the 1920s and finally with the creation of Nigehörn on the same sandbank, the name Scharhörn was only used for the island. Though Scharhörn is generally flood-safe, the  banks of the island are not protected, so the island faces permanent loss of land on the western side as storm floods gradually shift the sandbank eastward.

The sandbank on which Scharhörn and Nigehörn lie is a European Union Natura 2000-designated bird sanctuary, tended to by the environmental group Verein Jordsand. Public access to the island is forbidden, except on official tours or by prior arrangement with the warden.

History 

In 1937, the island became part of the Prussian Province of Hanover as a result of the Greater Hamburg Act. The island changed hands again in 1947, when it became part of the newly-drawn state of Lower Saxony, and again in 1969, when it was returned under a treaty to the control of Hamburg for the purpose of constructing a proposed deepwater port on Scharhörn and nearby Neuwerk. The plans foresaw the construction of a  mound of land built from dredged sand, which was to be safe from the storm floods of the North Sea and connected to the mainland via a causeway from Scharhörn to Neuwerk to Cuxhaven. The plan was never realised, plagued by protests, high costs, and low levels of public support, but nevertheless remains included in the land use plan of Hamburg.

Shipwrecks 

The Elbe has been one of the busiest shipping lanes in the world for many centuries, and the waters around Scharhörn were very dangerous until the late 20th century. This has made the reefs a ship graveyard for hundreds of ships, their crews, passengers or cargo. For the people of Neuwerk and the nearby coastal villages, this was an important source of income, sometimes even legally acquired for rescue and salvage operations. But picking up cargo and freight from the coast and from the tidal flats was also common until not long ago.

References 

Frisian Islands
Uninhabited islands of Germany
Islands of Hamburg
Nature reserves in Hamburg